Endoglin (ENG) is a type I membrane glycoprotein located on cell surfaces and is part of the TGF beta receptor complex. It is also commonly referred to as CD105, END, FLJ41744, HHT1, ORW and ORW1. It has a crucial role in angiogenesis, therefore, making it an important protein for tumor growth, survival and metastasis of cancer cells to other locations in the body.

Gene and expression 

The human endoglin gene is located on human chromosome 9 with location of the cytogenic band at 9q34.11. Endoglin glycoprotein is encoded by 39,757 bp and translates into 658 amino acids.

The expression of the endoglin gene is usually low in resting endothelial cells. This, however, changes once neoangiogenesis begins and endothelial cells become active in places like tumor vessels, inflamed tissues, skin with psoriasis, vascular injury and during embryogenesis.  The expression of the vascular system begins at about 4 weeks and continues after that. Other cells in which endoglin is expressed consist of monocytes, especially those transitioning into macrophages, low expression in normal smooth muscle cells, high expression vascular smooth muscle cells and in kidney and liver tissues undergoing fibrosis.

Structure 

The glycoprotein consists of a homodimer of 180 kDA stabilized by intermolecular disulfide bonds. It has a large extracellular domain of about 561 amino acids, a hydrophobic transmembrane domain and a short cytoplasmic tail domain composed of 45 amino acids. The 260 amino acid region closest to the extracellular membrane is referred to as the ZP domain (or, more correctly, ZP module). The outermost extracellular region is termed as the orphan domain (or orphan region) and it is the part that binds ligands such as BMP-9.
 
There are two isoforms of endoglin created by alternative splicing: the long isoform (L-endoglin) and the short isoform (S-endoglin). However, the L-isoform is expressed to a greater extent than the S-isoform. A soluble form of endoglin can be produced by the proteolytic cleaving action of metalloproteinase MMP-14 in the extracellular domain near the membrane. 
It has been found on endothelial cells in all tissues, activated macrophages, activated monocytes, lymphoblasts fibroblasts, and smooth muscle cells. Endoglin was first identified using monoclonal antibody (mAb) 44G4 but more mAbs against endoglin have been discovered, giving more ways to identify it in tissues.

It is suggested that endoglin has 5 potential N-linked glycosylation sites in the N-terminal domain and an O-glycan domain near the membrane domain that is rich in Serine and Threonine. The cytoplasmic tail contains a PDZ-binding motif that allows it to bind to PDZ containing proteins and interact with them. It contains an Arginine-Glycine-Aspartic Acid (RGD) tripeptide sequence that enables cellular adhesion, through the binding of integrins or other RGD binding receptors that are present in the extracellular matrix (ECM).  This RGD sequence on endoglin is the first RGD sequence identified on endothelial tissue.

X-ray crystallographic structures of human endoglin and its complex with ligand BMP-9 revealed that the orphan region of the protein consists of two domains (OR1 and OR2) with a new fold resulting from gene duplication and circular permutation. The ZP module, whose ZP-N and ZP-C moieties are closely packed against each other, mediates the homodimerization of endoglin by forming an intermolecular disulfide bond that involves cysteine 516. Together with a second intermolecular disulfide, involving cysteine 582, this generates a molecular clamp that secures the ligand via interaction of two copies of OR1 with the knuckle regions of homodimeric BMP-9. In addition to rationalizing a large number of HHT1 mutations, the crystal structure of endoglin shows that the epitope of anti-ENG monoclonal antibody TRC105 overlaps with the binding site for BMP-9.

Interactions 

Endoglin has been shown to interact with high affinity to TGF beta receptor 3 and TGF beta receptor 1, and with lower affinity to TGF beta receptor 2. It has high sequence similarity to another TGF beta binding protein, betaglycan, which was one of the first cues that indicated that endoglin is a TGF beta binding proteins. However, it has been shown that TGF beta binds with high affinity to only a small amount of the available endoglin, which suggests that there is another factor regulating this binding.

Endoglin itself doesn't bind the TGF beta ligands, but is present with the TGF beta receptors when the ligand is bound, indicating an important role for endoglin. The full length endoglin will bind to the TGF beta receptor complex whether TGF beta is bound or not, but the truncated forms of endoglin have more specific binding. The amino acid (aa) region 437–558 in the extracellular domain of endoglin will bind to TGF beta receptor II. TGF beta receptor I binds to the 437-588 aa region and to the aa region between 437 and the N-terminus. Unlike TGF beta receptor I which can only bind the cytoplasmic tail when its kinase domain is inactive, TGF beta receptor II can bind endoglin with an inactive and active kinase domain. The kinase is active when it is phosphorylated. Furthermore, TGF beta receptor I will dissociate from endoglin soon after it phosphorylates its cytoplasmic tail, leaving TGF beta receptor I inactive. Endoglin is constituitively phosphorylated at the serine and threonine residues in the cytoplasmic domain. The high interaction between endoglin's cytoplasmic and extracellular tail with the TGF beta receptor complexes indicates an important role for endoglin in the modulation of the TGF beta responses, such as cellular localization and cellular migration.

Endoglin can also mediate F-actin dynamics, focal adhesions, microtubular structures, endocytic vesicular transport through its interaction with zyxin, ZRP-1, beta-arrestin and Tctex2beta, LK1, ALK5, TGF beta receptor II, and GIPC. In one study with mouse fibroblasts, the overexpression of endoglin resulted in a reduction of some ECM components, decreased cellular migration, a change in cellular morphology and intercellular cluster formation.

Function 

Endoglin has been found to be an auxiliary receptor for the TGF-beta receptor complex.   It thus is involved in modulating a response to the binding of TGF-beta1, TGF-beta3, activin-A, BMP-2, BMP-7 and BMP-9. Beside TGF-beta signaling endoglin may have other functions. It has been postulated that endoglin is involved in the cytoskeletal organization affecting cell morphology and migration.
Endoglin has a role in the development of the cardiovascular system and in vascular remodeling. Its expression is regulated during heart development . Experimental mice without the endoglin gene die due to cardiovascular abnormalities.

Clinical significance 

In humans endoglin may be involved in the autosomal dominant disorder known as hereditary hemorrhagic telangiectasia (HHT) type 1. HHT is actually the first human disease linked to the TGF beta receptor complex. This condition leads to frequent nose bleeds, telangiectases on skin and mucosa and may cause arteriovenous malformations in different organs including brain, lung, and liver.

Mutations causing HHT 

Some mutations that lead to this disorder are:
 a Cytosine (C) to Guanine (G) substitution which converts a tyrosine to stop codon
 a 39 base pair deletion
 a 2 base pair deletion which creates an early stop codon

Endoglin levels have been found to be elevated in pregnant women who subsequently develop preeclampsia.

Role in cancer 

The role of endoglin plays in angiogenesis and the modulation of TGF beta receptor signaling, which mediates cellular localization, cellular migration, cellular morphology, cell proliferation, cluster formation, etc., makes endoglin an important player in tumor growth and metastasis. Being able to target and efficiently reduce or halt neoangiogenesis in tumors would prevent metastasis of primary cancer cells into other areas of the body. Also, it has been suggested that endoglin can be used for tumor imaging and prognosis.

The role of endoglin in cancer can be contradicting at times since it is needed for neoangiogenesis in tumors, which is needed for tumor growth and survival, yet the reduction in expression of endoglin has in many cancers correlated with a negative outcome of that cancer. In breast cancer, for example, the reduction of the full form of endoglin, and the increase of the soluble form of endoglin correlate with metastasis of cancer cells.  The TGF beta receptor-endoglin complex relay contradicting signals from TGF beta as well. TGF beta can act as a tumor suppressor in the premalignant stage of the benign neoplasm by inhibiting its growth and inducing apoptosis.  However, once the cancer cells have gone through the Hallmarks of Cancer and lost inhibitory growth responses, TGF beta mediates cell invasion, angiogenesis (with the help of endoglin), immune system evasion, and their ECM composition, allowing them to become malignant.

Prostate cancer and endoglin expression

It has been shown that endoglin expression and TGF-beta secretion are attenuated in bone marrow stromal cells when they are cocultured with prostate cancer cells. Also, the downstream TGF-beta/bone morphogenic protein (BMP) signaling pathway, which includes Smad1 and Smad2/3, were attenuated along with Smad-dependent gene transcription. Another result in this study was that both Smad1/5/8-dependent inhibitor of DNA binding 1 expression and Smad2/3-dependent plasminogen activator inhibitor I had a reduction in expression and cell proliferation. Ultimately, the cocultured prostate cancer cells altered the TGF-beta signaling in the bone stromal cells, which suggests this modulation is a mechanism of prostate cancer metastases facilitating their growth and survival in the reactive bone stroma. This study emphasizes the importance of endoglin in TGF-beta signaling pathways in other cell types other than endothelial cells.

As a drug target
TRC105 is an experimental antibody targeted at endoglin as an anti-angiogenesis treatment for soft-tissue sarcoma.

See also 
 Cluster of differentiation

References

External links 
  GeneReviews/NCBI/NIH/UW entry on Hereditary Hemorrhagic Telangiectasia
 

Clusters of differentiation
Growth factors
Signal transduction